SK Lejon is a Swedish ice hockey club based in Skellefteå, founded in 1958 as "Lejonströms SK".  The club was given its current name in 1997.  , the club plays in Division 1, the third tier of ice hockey in Sweden.  The club plays their home games at Skellefteå Kraft Arena, an arena they share with SHL-club Skellefteå AIK.

External links
 Official website
 Profile on Eliteprospects.com

Ice hockey teams in Sweden
Ice hockey clubs established in 1958
Ice hockey teams in Västerbotten County